Luca Pellegrini may refer to:

 Luca Pellegrini (swimmer) (born 1964), Italian former swimmer
 Luca Pellegrini (footballer, born 1963), retired Italian footballer
 Luca Pellegrini (footballer, born 1999), Italian footballer

See also
 Lucas Pellegrini (born 2000), French footballer